Jörgen Tage Wilhelm Warborn (born 23 January 1969) is a Swedish entrepreneur and politician of the Moderate Party who has been serving as Member of the European Parliament since the 2018 elections. In parliament, he serves as vice coordinator for the European People's Party in the Committee on International Trade; Politico Europe has named him as the most free trade friendly politician in the European Parliament. 

Prior to entering European politics, Warborn was Mayor of Varberg Municipality from the 2010 general election until his election to the Riksdag in 2014. He was reelected to the Riksdag in 2018.

Education and early career
Warborn studied economics and leadership at the International University of Monaco, international relations at the London School of Economics, and entrepreneurship at Babson College in Boston. 

Warborn started his first business at the age of 17 and has since then started and managed several small business, primarily in the IT and marketing sector.

Political career
Warborn's political commitment grew in the early 1990s, when he wanted Sweden to become part of the European Union. In the Swedish 1994 referendum on EU membership, Warborn was the county campaign leader for the "Yes"-campaign, that organized 14 political parties and NGOs in Halland County. 

After studying abroad, Warborn moved back to Varberg in 2005 and became active in the Moderate Party. He became mayor of Varberg in 2010 and a member of parliament in 2014. In addition to his role in parliament, Warborn briefly served as member of the Swedish delegation to the Parliamentary Assembly of the Council of Europe in 2019.

Since 2016, Warborn has been national chairman of the Moderate Party's business council.

From 2021 to 2022, Warborn was the rapporteur for the European Commission’s plan to reduce shipping emissions.

In addition to his committee assignments, Warborn is part of the European Parliament Intergroup on Small and Medium-Sized Enterprises (SMEs).

Recognition
In March 2022, IDG and Tech Sweden named Warborn as one of the most influential in tech and AI in Sweden.

Personal life
Warborn lives in Varberg on the Swedish west coast. He is since 2008 married to Titti Warborn, and the couple have three children. His wife is also a small business entrepreneur, managing a furniture store.

References 

Living people
1964 births
People from Varberg
MEPs for Sweden 2019–2024
Moderate Party MEPs